Maras-e Bozorg (also Romanized as Maras Bozorg and Mares Bozorg; also known as Marest-e Bozorg) is a village in Estakhr-e Posht Rural District, Hezarjarib District, Neka County, Mazandaran Province, Iran. At the 2006 census, its population was 130, in 36 families.

References 

Populated places in Neka County